Magnetic diffusion refers to the motion of magnetic fields, typically in the presence of a conducting solid or fluid such as a plasma. The motion of magnetic fields is described by the magnetic diffusion equation and is due primarily to induction and diffusion of magnetic fields through the material. The magnetic diffusion equation is a partial differential equation commonly used in physics. Understanding the phenomenon is essential to magnetohydrodynamics and has important consequences in astrophysics, geophysics, and electrical engineering.

Equation 
The magnetic diffusion equation is 
 
The first term on the right hand side accounts for effects from induction of the plasma, while the second accounts for diffusion. The latter acts as a dissipation term, resulting in a loss of magnetic field energy to heat. The relative importance of the two terms is characterized by the magnetic Reynolds number, .

In the case of a non-uniform conductivity the magnetic diffusion equation is
 
however, it becomes significantly harder to solve.

Derivation 
Starting from the generalized Ohm's law:
 
and the curl equations for small displacement currents (i.e. low frequencies)
 
 
substitute  into the Ampere-Maxwell law to get
 .
Taking the curl of the above equation and substituting into Faraday's law,
 .
 
Using the identity  and recalling , the cross products can be eliminated:
 
Written in vector form, the final expression is
 
where  is the material derivative. This can be rearranged into a more useful form using vector calculus identities and :
 
In the case , this becomes a diffusion equation for the magnetic field,
 
where  is the magnetic diffusivity.

Limiting Cases 
In some cases it is possible to neglect one of the terms in the magnetic diffusion equation. This is done by estimating the magnetic Reynolds number

Relation to Skin Effect
At low frequencies, the skin depth  for the penetration of an AC electromagnetic field into a conductor is:
 

Examples and Visualization

For the limit , the magnetic field lines become "frozen in" to the motion of the conducting fluid. A simple example illustrating this behavior has a sinusoidally-varying shear flow
 
with a uniform initial magnetic field . The equation for this limit, has the solution
 
As can be seen in the figure to the right, the fluid drags the magnetic field lines so that they obtain the sinusoidal character of the flow field.

For the limit , the magnetic diffusion equation  is just a vector-valued form of the heat equation. For a localized initial magnetic field (e.g. Gaussian distribution) within a conducting material, the maxima and minima will asymptotically decay to a value consistent with Laplace's equation for the given boundary conditions. This behavior is illustrated in the figure below.

Diffusion Times for Stationary Conductors 
For stationary conductors  with simple geometries a time constant called magnetic diffusion time can be derived.  Different one-dimensional equations apply for conducting slabs and conducting cylinders with constant magnetic permeability.  Also, different diffusion time equations can be derived for nonlinear saturable materials such as steel.

References

Magnetism
Plasma physics